Hoštice-Heroltice is a municipality in Vyškov District in the South Moravian Region of the Czech Republic. It has about 600 inhabitants.

Administrative parts
The municipality is made up of villages of Hoštice and Heroltice. The two villages are urbanistically fused.

Geography
It lies in a flat agricultural landscape of the Vyškov Gate. The municipality is situated on the left bank of the Haná River.

History
The first written mention of Hoštice is from 1445, Heroltice was first mentioned in 1349. Hoštice and Heroltice were merged into one municipality in 1942.

Transport
The D1 motorway runs through the southern part of the municipality.

Notable people
Klement Gottwald (1896–1953), politician and President of Czechoslovakia; possible birthplace
Pavel Zedníček (born 1949), actor
Milan Petržela (born 1983), footballer

References

External links

Villages in Vyškov District